The 2019 Football Championship of Zaporizhzhia Oblast was won by Motor Zaporizhzhia.

League table

References

Football
Zaporizhia
Zaporizhia